Cosmetics, first used in ancient Rome for ritual purposes, were part of daily life.  Some fashionable cosmetics, such as those imported from Germany, Gaul and China, were so expensive that the Lex Oppia tried to limit their use in 189 BCE. These "designer brands" spawned cheap knock-offs that were sold to poorer women. Working-class women could afford the cheaper varieties, but may not have had the time (or slaves) to apply the makeup as the use of makeup was a time-consuming affair because cosmetics needed to be reapplied several times a day due to weather conditions and poor composition.

Cosmetics were applied in private, usually in a small room where men did not enter. Cosmetae, female slaves that adorned their mistresses, were especially praised for their skills. They would beautify their mistresses with cultus, the Latin word encompassing makeup, perfume and jewelry.

Scent was also an important factor of beauty. Women who smelled good were presumed to be healthy. Due to the stench of many of the ingredients used in cosmetics at the time, women often drenched themselves in copious amounts of perfume.

Christian women tended to avoid cosmetics with the belief that they should praise what God gave them. Some men, especially cross-dressers, did use cosmetics, although it was viewed as effeminate and improper.

All cosmetic ingredients were also used as medicines to treat various ailments. Lead, although known to be poisonous, was still widely used.

Men's attitudes
Roman attitudes towards cosmetics evolved with the expansion of the empire. The assortment of cosmetics available increased as trade borders expanded and the resulting influx of wealth granted women additional slaves and time to spend on beauty. Ideas of beauty from conquered peoples, especially the Greeks and Egyptians, greatly influenced the Roman paradigm of beauty. Unlike their eastern trading partners however, the Romans felt that only the "preservation of beauty" was acceptable and not "unnatural embellishment". Despite exaggerating their makeup to make it appear in the poor lighting of the time, women still wanted to appear natural as a sign of chastity . Artificiality denoted a desire to be seductive, which made men question for whom exactly a woman was trying to appear attractive. In particular, Romans did not like unnatural colors on the eyes and overlined eyes. This was why men generally viewed the use of cosmetics as deceitful and manipulative. Vestal Virgins did not don makeup because they were supposed to look holy and chaste. Postumia, one of the Vestal Virgins,  defied this convention and consequently, was accused of incestum.

Of all the surviving texts mentioning cosmetics (all written by men) Ovid is alone in his approval of their use. The consensus was that women who used cosmetics in excess were immoral and deceptive and were practicing a form of witchcraft. Juvenal wrote that "a woman buys scents and lotions with adultery in mind" and mocked the need for cosmetics, believing that they were ineffective. Use of perfumes was further looked down upon because they were thought to mask the smell of sex and alcohol. Seneca advised virtuous women to avoid cosmetics, as he believed their use to be a part of the decline of morality in Rome. Stoics were also against the use of cosmetics, as they were opposed to the usage of all man-made luxuries. Although there are no surviving texts written by women expounding the attitude of women towards cosmetics, their widespread use indicates that women accepted and enjoyed these products.

Skincare

Pure white skin, a demarcation of the aristocracy, was the most important feature of Roman beauty. Pale skin gave the impression of a higher social status. It was assumed that if a woman had pale skin, she stayed inside because she could afford slaves that would go outside and do labor she otherwise would have done.

Women would often prepare their faces with beauty masks prior to applying makeup. One recipe called for the application of sweat from sheep's wool (lanolin) to the face before bedtime, emitting a stench often criticized by men. Other ingredients included juice, seeds, horns, excrement, honey, plants, placenta, marrow, vinegar, bile, animal urine, sulfur, vinegar, eggs, myrrh, incense, frankincense, ground oyster shells, onions with poultry fat, white lead, and barley with vetch. Bathing in asses’ milk was an expensive treatment that worked like a chemical peel and was used by wealthy women such as Cleopatra VII and Poppaea Sabina.

After their baths, they would then apply face whitener, such as chalk powder, white marl, crocodile dung and white lead. The Roman recognition that lead was poisonous underscored their point of view on how important white skin was. Other ingredients used in whiteners included beeswax, olive oil, rosewater, saffron, animal fat, tin oxide, starch, rocket (arugula), cucumber, anise, mushrooms, honey, rose leaves, poppies, myrrh, frankincense, almond oil, rosewater, lily root, water parsnip and eggs. In Ovid's Art of Beauty, he gives a recipe and directions on how to make a face whitener.
The Romans disliked wrinkles, freckles, sunspots, skin flakes and blemishes. To soften wrinkles, they used swans’ fat, asses’ milk, gum Arabic and bean-meal. Sores and freckles were treated with the ashes of snails. The Romans pasted soft leather patches of alum directly over blemishes to pretend that they were beauty marks. Criminals and freedmen used these leather patches, which came in both round and crescent shapes, to conceal brand marks.

With the exception of hair on her head, hair was considered to be unattractive on a Roman woman. Consequently, women removed hair by either shaving, plucking, stripping using a resin paste, or scraping with a pumice stone. Older women faced ridicule for their depilation because it was viewed primarily as preparation for sex.

Rouge
Although Romans esteemed pale faces, a light pink on the cheeks was considered to be attractive, signifying good health. Plutarch wrote that too much rouge made a woman look showy, while Martial mocked women, believing that rouge was in danger of melting in the sun.
Sources of rouge included Tyrian vermillion, rose and poppy petals, fucus, red chalk, alkanet, and crocodile dung. Red ochre, a more expensive blush, was imported from Belgium and ground against a stone into powder. Despite a widespread knowledge that cinnabar and red lead were poisonous, they were both still used extensively. Cheap alternatives included mulberry juice and wine dregs.

Eye makeup

The ideal eyes, from the Roman perspective, were large with long eyelashes. Pliny the Elder wrote that eyelashes fell out from sexual excess, and so it was especially important for women to keep their eyelashes long to prove their chastity.

Kohl was the main ingredient in eye makeup, and was composed of ashes or soot and antimony, with saffron usually added to improve the smell. Kohl was applied using a rounded stick, made of ivory, glass, bone, or wood, that would be dipped in either oil or water first, before being used to apply the kohl. The use of kohl as makeup came from the east. In addition to kohl, charred rose petals and date stones could be used to darken the eyes.

Colored eyeshadow was also applied by women to accentuate their eyes. Green eyeshadow came from malachite, while blue came from azurite.

The Romans preferred dark eyebrows that almost met in the center. This effect was achieved by darkening their eyebrows with antimony or soot and then extending them inward. Plucking began in the 1st century BCE to tidy their overall look.

Lips, nails and teeth
Although evidence for the usage of lipstick appears in earlier civilizations, no such evidence has materialized to indicate that the Romans ever colored their lips. The only evidence for painting nails comes from a red dye they imported that was produced from an Indian insect. Generally only the wealthy cut their nails, as they used barbers to clip their nails short, following the contemporary practice for good hygiene.

Although oral hygiene was nowhere near today’s standards, white teeth were prized by the Romans, and so false teeth, made from bone, ivory and paste, were popular items. Ovid shed light on the way white teeth were viewed in society when he wrote the statement, "You can do yourself untold damage when you laugh if your teeth are black, too long or irregular." The Romans also sweetened their breath with powder and baking soda.

Perfume

Perfumes were very popular in Ancient Rome. In fact, they were so heavily used that Cicero claimed that, "The right scent for a woman is none at all." They came in liquid, solid and sticky forms and were often created in a maceration process with flowers or herbs and oil. Distillation technology, as well as most of the imported ingredients, originated in the east. The most prominent perfume market in Italy was Seplasia in Capua. Perfumes were rubbed on or poured onto the user and were often believed to be helpful against different ailments, such as fever and indigestion. Different scents were appropriate for different occasions, as well as for men and women. Deodorants made from alum, iris and rose petals were common.

In addition to personal use, perfumes were used in food and to freshen the household aroma.

Containers and mirrors
Makeup usually came in tablet or cake form, sold at marketplaces. Wealthy women bought expensive makeup that came in elaborate containers made from gold, wood, glass or bone. Kohl came in compartmentalized tubes that could store more than one color of eye makeup. Glassblowing, invented in the 1st century CE in Syria, lowered the price of containers. The most common color for glass was teal. Gladiator sweat and fats of the animals fighting in the arena were sold in souvenir pots outside of the games to improve complexion.

Mirrors in Ancient Rome were mostly hand mirrors made from polished metal, or mercury behind glass. Spending too much time in front of a mirror was thought to denote that a woman was weak in character.

Prostitutes

Cosmetics, and especially their overuse, were commonly associated with prostitutes, both being regarded as immoral and seductive. The Latin word lenocinium actually meant both "prostitution" and "makeup". Due to their low income, prostitutes tended to use cheaper cosmetics, which emitted rather foul odors. This, combined with the strong, exotic scents used to cover up the stench, made brothels smell especially rank. As prostitutes aged, with their income dependent on their appearance, they opted for more copious amounts of makeup. Courtesans often received cosmetics and perfumes as gifts or partial payment.

Men's use
Men are also known to have used cosmetics in Roman times, although it was frowned upon by society. Men seen carrying mirrors were viewed as effeminate, while those using face-whitening makeup were thought to be immoral because they were expected to be tanned from working outside. Two of the more acceptable practices were the light use of certain perfumes and moderate hair removal. A man removing too much hair was viewed as effeminate, while removing too little made him seem unrefined. The Romans found it especially inappropriate for an emperor to be vain, as was apparently the case with the Emperor Otho. The Emperor Elagabalus removed all of his body hair and often donned makeup, which caused the Romans much grief.

See also
 Medicamina Faciei Femineae, by Ovid, a singular didactic poem for the female face, whose methods are still used in the manufacture of cosmetics and pharmaceuticals today.

References

External links
 The History Channel: An Ancient Roman Make-up Lesson Video demonstration
 Ovid's "The Art of Beauty"
 A Brief History of Cosmetics in Roman Times
 BBC News: Ancient cosmetics brought to life
 BBC News: Roman cosmetic secrets revealed

History of cosmetics
Ancient Roman culture